The North Carolina Council of State elections of 2020 were held on November 3, 2020, to select the ten officers of the North Carolina Council of State. These elections coincided with the presidential election, elections to the House of Representatives, elections to the Senate and elections to the North Carolina General Assembly and top state courts. Primary elections were held on March 3, 2020, for offices for which more than one candidate filed per party.

The ten members of the North Carolina Council of State are statewide-elected officers serving four-year terms.

The result of the 2020 elections was a Council of State consisting of 4 Democrats and 6 Republicans, just as it had been before the elections. Three seats (Lieutenant Governor, Superintendent of Public Instruction and Commissioner of Labor) were open, but in each case, a Republican succeeded a fellow Republican.

Governor

Incumbent Governor Roy Cooper, a Democrat, ran for a second term. The Republican Party nominated Lt. Governor Dan Forest. The Libertarian Party nominated Steven J. DiFore and the Constitution Party nominated Al Pisano. Cooper won re-election to a second term with 51.5% of the vote. Cooper received the most votes of any Democrat on the ballot in North Carolina in 2020.

Lieutenant Governor

Incumbent Lt. Gov. Dan Forest, a Republican, was ineligible to run for a second term due to term limits set by the North Carolina Constitution. Forest ran for the governorship.

The Republican Party nominated Mark Robinson, a businessman and first-time political candidate. The Democratic party nominated State Representative Yvonne Lewis Holley. Robinson defeated Holley, winning 51.6% of the vote to Holley's 48.4%. Robinson thus became North Carolina's first African-American lieutenant governor.

Attorney General

Incumbent Attorney General Josh Stein, a Democrat, ran for a second term. He faced Republican nominee Jim O'Neill in the general election. Stein defeated O'Neill by just over 13,000 votes out of over 5.4 million cast.

Secretary of State

Elaine Marshall, a Democrat, was first elected to the position of Secretary of State in 1996 and has held the position since then. She is currently the longest-tenured member of the Council of State. She was unopposed in the primary. The Republican Party nominated businessman E.C. Sykes. Marshall won with 51.2% of the vote, a slightly smaller percentage of the vote than what she received in 2016. She was elected to her seventh term as Secretary of State. No Republican has won election to this office since 1872, the longest streak for any state office in the country.

Democratic primary

Candidates

Declared
Elaine Marshall, incumbent Secretary of State

Republican primary

Candidates

Declared
Chad Brown, Gaston County commissioner
Michael LaPaglia, business consultant and nominee for North Carolina Secretary of State in 2016
E.C. Sykes, businessman

Polling

Results

General election

Predictions

Polling

Results

State Auditor

Incumbent Auditor Beth Wood, a Democrat, ran for a fourth term. She was narrowly re-elected in 2016, winning by just over six thousand votes. Wood was challenged in the Democratic primary by Luis Toledo, a former Assistant State Auditor. Toledo argued that change was needed in the Auditor's office. Beth Wood won the primary by a large margin. Anthony Street, a small business owner and member of the Brunswick County Soil and Water Board, won the Republican primary. Wood won the general election with 50.9% of the vote.

Democratic primary

Candidates

Declared
Luis Toledo, U.S. Air Force veteran
Beth Wood, incumbent State Auditor

Results

Republican primary

Candidates

Declared
Tim Hoegemeyer, general counsel for the Office of State Auditor and U.S. Marine Corps veteran
Tony Wayne Street, Brunswick County Soil and Water Board member

Results

General election

Results

State Treasurer

Incumbent Treasurer Dale Folwell, a Republican, ran for a second term.

Duke University professor Ronnie Chatterji won the nomination of the Democratic Party by receiving 36% of the vote in the primary. He defeated Charlotte City Council member Dimple Ajmera and Matt Leatherman,  who served as policy director for former State Treasurer Janet Cowell.

Folwell defeated Chatterji in the general election. Folwell won 52.6% of the vote to Chatterji's 47.4%.

Democratic primary

Candidates

Declared
Dimple Ajmera, Charlotte city councilwoman
Ronnie Chatterji, professor at Duke University
Matt Leatherman, policy director for former North Carolina State Treasurer Janet Cowell

Polling

Results

Republican primary

Candidates

Declared
Dale Folwell, incumbent State Treasurer

General election

Polling

Results

Superintendent of Public Instruction

Mark Johnson was elected to the position of State Superintendent in 2016, defeating incumbent June Atkinson by a narrow margin. Johnson opted not to run for a second term as Superintendent, instead declaring his candidacy for Lieutenant Governor. Johnson's candidacy was unsuccessful, placing third in the Republican primary.

Jen Mangrum, an associate professor at UNC Greensboro, received the most votes out of the five candidates in the Democratic primary. Catherine Truitt, chancellor of Western Governors University North Carolina and a former education advisor to Governor Pat McCrory, ran for the Republican nomination. She defeated State Representative D. Craig Horn in the primary. This was the only Council of State election in which both candidates were women.

On Election Day, Truitt defeated Magnum by 2.76 percentage points. She won a slightly higher percentage of the vote than Mark Johnson did in 2016.

Democratic primary

Candidates

Declared
James Barrett, Chapel Hill-Carrboro City school board member
Constance Lav Johnson, educator and activist
Michael Maher, assistant dean of professional education at North Carolina State University
Jen Mangrum, associate professor at UNC Greensboro and candidate for North Carolina Senate in 2018
Keith Sutton, Wake County School board member

Withdrawn
Amy Jablonski, educational consultant and former teacher

Results

Republican primary

Candidates

Declared
D. Craig Horn, state representative
Catherine Truitt, chancellor of Western Governors University in North Carolina and former senior education advisor to Pat McCrory

Declined
Mark Johnson, incumbent Superintendent of Public Instruction

Results

General election

Polling

Results

Commissioner of Agriculture

Incumbent Commissioner Steve Troxler, a Republican, was first elected in 2004. He was unopposed in the primary.

Three Democrats ran to challenge Troxler: Walter Smith, who ran for the office in 2012 and 2016 (losing to Troxler both times), Jenna Wadsworth, a Wake County Soil and Water Conservation District supervisor, and Donovan Alexander Watson, a businessman from Durham. Wadsworth came in first place in the primary.

On election day, Troxler won a fifth term as Agriculture Commissioner. He won 53.9% of the statewide vote, a slightly smaller percentage than he received in 2016, when he won 55.6%. Despite this, Troxler still won the largest percentage of the vote of statewide candidate in North Carolina in 2020.

Democratic primary

Candidates

Declared
Walter Smith, 2012 and 2016 Democratic nominee
Jenna Wadsworth, Wake County Soil and Water Conservation District supervisor
Donovan Alexander Watson, businessman

Results

Republican primary

Candidates

Declared
Steve Troxler, incumbent Agriculture Commissioner (unopposed in the primary)

General election

Polling

Results

Commissioner of Labor

Cherie Berry was first elected to the position of Commissioner of Labor in 2000 and took office as only the second Republican Labor Commissioner in the history of North Carolina. On April 2, 2019, Berry announced that she would not seek re-election, and would retire from politics. Josh Dobson, a member of the North Carolina House of Representatives since 2013, won the Republican primary over Chuck Stanley, a construction safety manager, and former State Rep. Pearl Burris-Floyd. Wake County commissioner Jessica Holmes was the only Democrat to run. Dobson won the general election with 50.8% of the vote.

Democratic primary

Candidates

Declared
Jessica Holmes, Wake County commissioner (unopposed in the primary)

Republican primary

Candidates

Declared
Pearl Burris-Floyd, former state representative
Josh Dobson, state representative
Chuck Stanley, construction safety manager

Declined
Cherie Berry, incumbent State Labor Commissioner

Results

General election

Results

Commissioner of Insurance

Incumbent Commissioner Mike Causey, a Republican, ran for a second term.

Democratic primary

Candidates

Declared
Wayne Goodwin, chairman of the North Carolina Democratic Party and former State Insurance Commissioner (2009–2017)

Republican primary

Candidates

Declared
Mike Causey, incumbent State Insurance Commissioner
Ronald Pierce, candidate for North Carolina Commissioner of Insurance in 2016

Results

General election

Polling

Results

Aftermath 
The Council of State was sworn in on January 9, 2021.

Notes

See also
 2020 North Carolina judicial elections
 2020 North Carolina elections

References

External links 
NC State Board of Elections
NC State Board of Elections: Council of State Primary Election Results
NC State Board of Elections: General Election results for Council of State
 
 
  (State affiliate of the U.S. League of Women Voters)
 

Official campaign websites for Secretary of State
 Elaine Marshall (D) for Secretary of State
 E.C. Sykes (R) for Secretary of State

Official campaign websites for Auditor
 Tony Street (R) for Auditor
 Beth Wood (D) for Auditor

Official campaign websites for Treasurer
 Ronnie Chatterji (D) for Treasurer
 Dale Folwell (R) for Treasurer

Official campaign websites for Superintendent
 Jen Mangrum (D) for Superintendent
 Catherine Truitt (R) for Superintendent

Official campaign websites for Ag Commissioner
 Steve Troxler (R) for Ag Commissioner
 Jenna Wadsworth (D) for Ag Commissioner

Official campaign websites for Labor Commissioner
 Josh Dobson (R) for Labor Commissioner
 Jessica Holmes (D) for Labor Commissioner

Official campaign websites for Insurance Commissioner
 Mike Causey (R) for Insurance Commissioner
 Wayne Goodwin (D) for Insurance Commissioner

Council of State
2020
North Carolina Council of State